Taxi is a pinball machine designed by Mark Ritchie and Python Anghelo.  It was released in 1988 by Williams Electronics.

Gameplay
The goal of the game is to pick up five passengers: Pinbot, Gorbie, Lola (or Marilyn Monroe in the original version), Dracula, and Santa. The passengers are represented by lighted illustrations in the center of the lower end of the playfield and are also featured on the backglass. If Carry Passengers is not lit, all passengers are lost when the ball drains. The original game featured Marilyn Monroe with her recognizable blonde hair on the backglass. Collecting all five passengers lights the Jackpot, which is available for about ten seconds.

A score award is given for each extra ball awarded beyond five.

This was the first Williams game to display four player scores using only two alpha-numeric 16 character displays.

Marilyn passenger
Originally the machine featured a passenger named Marilyn, a blonde character in a red dress bearing a resemblance to Marilyn Monroe. Williams replaced the Marilyn passenger with a new passenger named Lola due to legal problems with Marilyn Monroe likeness. Lola appears identical to Marilyn, with the exception of her hair; the Lola passenger was pictured brunette and later with red hair where the Marilyn character was blonde. At least 200 sample games were shipped with 'Marilyn' before the change was made. Mark Ritchie explained also in the book The Pinball Compendium 1982 to Present, that the name 'Lola' was taken from the 1970s song "Lola" about a transvestite, that fits also to her muscular arms on the backglass.

Marketing slogans
"Get ready for the taxi everyone's going to be lining up for!"

"The one taxi Lola, Gorbie, Santa, Dracula... and operators everywhere are hailing!"

"The one taxi Marilyn, Gorbie, Santa, Dracula... and operators everywhere are hailing!"

Digital versions
Taxi was formerly available simulated in The Pinball Arcade on any platform until WMS license expired on June 30, 2018, thus making this table taken down from every digital store. Taxi is also featured in Pinball Hall of Fame: The Williams Collection. Unauthorized reproductions of this table are available for Visual Pinball that runs on Windows.

References

External links
IPDB listing for Taxi

1988 pinball machines
Williams pinball machines
Works about taxis
Cultural depictions of Mikhail Gorbachev
Cultural depictions of Marilyn Monroe
Dracula
Santa Claus